Tick Tock was a music group from Puerto Rico. They were active for only two years (2004–06). Their Puerto Rican fans knew them as a younger version of Menudo since they covered some of their songs like ,  and more. They also covered the song "Bidi Bidi Bom Bom" from Selena with a few adjustments. The traditional song "Burrito Savanero" they covered with a twist and a few adjustments. They also appeared in local educational shows in Puerto Rico, singing "Sube a mi Motora", "Contigo Se Irá", "Ven al baile" and "Boogie Boogie". They released two albums, Tick Tock Marcando el Ritmo and Tick Tock Marcando el Reggetón. They also appeared on Espectacular 2006 on Univision where they sang a medley of songs by Menudo and Descorazonado. After the band's dissolvement, one of the members, Joseph Alicea López, became a vocalist for Los Super Reyes under the stage name Jo-Joe from 2007 to 2010.

Their song "Yo Soy Boricua" became a cultural anthem to Puerto Ricans, with the lyrics "Yo soy Boricua, pa' que tú lo sepas", which loosely translates to "I am Boricua, for you to be aware". The lyrics became a very popular phrase to display Puerto Rican culture and pride, mainly in public activities.

Discography

Marcando el Ritmo

References

Puerto Rican musical groups